The Balkh Legends ( Da Balkh Atalān) are a franchise cricket team which participates in the Afghanistan Premier League (APL). They joined the APL as one of its original members in 2018. Afghan alrounder Mohammad Nabi was the captain for the inaugural session and Australian coach Simon Helmot was appointed as the head coach of the team. They won the first edition, after beating Kabul Zwanan by four wickets in the final.

Current squad

Administration and Supporting Staff
Head Coach:  Simon Helmot

References

Afghan domestic cricket competitions
Cricket clubs established in 2018
2018 in Afghan cricket
Afghanistan Premier League teams
Mazar-i-Sharif